The 2016–17 Meistriliiga season was the 77th season of the Meistriliiga, the top level of ice hockey in Estonia. The season began on 22 October 2016 and ended on 25 March 2017 with Narva PSK winning their 18th Estonian Championship trophy.

Teams

Regular season

League table

Playoffs

Bracket

References

External links
 Official website

Estonia
2016 in Estonian sport
2017 in Estonian sport
Meistriliiga (ice hockey) seasons